The New Hampshire State Library is a library in Concord, New Hampshire, and also a state agency, overseen since 2017 by the New Hampshire Department of Natural and Cultural Resources (DNCR). The physical building is located across the street from the New Hampshire State House.

History
The library's origins pre-date the United States: "The beginnings of the State Library were in 1717 and it is generally considered to be the oldest such institution in the United States." Originally housed in Portsmouth, the state library has been located in Concord since 1808. The current building opened in 1895, and also housed the New Hampshire Supreme Court until 1970.

References

Further reading

External links
Official website

Buildings and structures in Concord, New Hampshire
Libraries in Merrimack County, New Hampshire
State Library
State libraries of the United States